The Government of China is the recognized government of the People's Republic of China;

Government of China may also refer to:

Contemporary 

 Government of the Republic of China, various historical governments of the Republic of China

Historical 

 Chinese dynasties
 Government of the Han dynasty (202 BC–220 AD)
 Provisional Government of the Republic of China (1912)
 Beiyang government (1912–1928)
 Nationalist government (1927–1948)
 Chinese Soviet Republic (1931–1934)
 People's Revolutionary Government of the Republic of China (1933–1934)
 Provisional Government of the Republic of China (1937–1940)
 Reformed Government of the Republic of China (1938–1940)
 Government of the Republic of China—Nanjing (1940–1945)

See also
 Government of Hong Kong
 Government of Macau
 List of Chinese monarchs
 Politics of the People's Republic of China
 Politics of the Republic of China
 Constituents of historical governments of China before 1912:
 Chancellor of China
 Emperor of China
 Imperial examinations
 Nine Ministers
 Grand Secretariat
 Three Departments and Six Ministries
 Three Excellencies
 Two Chinas